Ali Adil Shah I (1558–1579) was the fifth Sultan of Bijapur Sultanate.

On the day of his coronation Ali abandoned the Sunni practices and reintroduced the Shi’ah Khutbah and other practices. The Persian doctors of religion were granted full freedom to preach the Shi’ah doctrine and were paid by the State for their missionary activities.

The new Sultan restored back to power the Afāqis while relegating the Deccanis to a position of insignificance. He subverted all the dogmatic experiments which his father had practiced.

Marriage
He married the famous woman warrior Chand Sultana, daughter of Nizam Shahis of Ahmadnagar.

Reign
During Ali's reign Bijapur and Vijayanagar came very close to each other and Ali actually paid a visit to Vijayanagar City, where Ramaraya received him with great pomp and honour. The greatest event of Ali's reign was the successful formation of the confederacy of the Deccan Sultans against Vijayanagar and their victory over the latter at the Battle of Rakkasagi – Tangadagi in Talikoti in 1565. As a result of this battle Bijapur’s southern boundary was extended right up to the city of Vijayanagar, and further it opened the gates for the future expansion of Bijapur further south. Consequently, at the end of Ali's reign, the Bijapur Kingdom extended up to port of Honavar on the west coast and southern boundary extended along the line of Varada and Tungabhadra rivers.

Developments
During Ali's reign diplomatic relations with the Mughal Emperor Akbar were established and envoys were exchanged.

Succession
In 1579, Ali having no son, appointed his nephew Ibrahim, son of his brother Tahamasif, as his successor. In the same year, Ali was assassinated by a eunuch, and was buried in Ali Ka Rouza near Sakaf Rouza in Bijapur.

References

 Wakiyate Mamlakate Bijapur by Basheeruddin Dehelvi.
 Tareekhe Farishta by Kasim Farishta
 External Relation of Bijapur Adil Shahis.

1579 deaths
Sultans of Bijapur
Adil Shahi dynasty
16th-century Indian monarchs
1579 in India
1558 in India
16th-century Indian Muslims
Year of birth unknown
1558 births
Murdered Indian monarchs
Converts to Shia Islam from Sunni Islam
Critics of Sunni Islam
16th-century murdered monarchs
Murder in 1579